Stumpe is a surname. Notable people with the surname include:

Bent Stumpe, made first touch screen
Isabel Stumpe
William Stumpe (by 1498–1552), English politician and clothier
James Stumpe, MP for Malmesbury (UK Parliament constituency)
John Stumpe, MP for Malmesbury (UK Parliament constituency)